The 2006 IBSF World Snooker Championship was an amateur snooker event, sanctioned by the International Billiards and Snooker Federation, held at the Amman Olympics Sports Centre in Amman, Jordan from November 5-November 15, 2006.

Results

Men
A total of 32 players qualified for finishing in the top 4 positions in eight groups. They were drawn into a 32 player knock-out bracket to decide the winner.

Women
Source: Snooker Scene

Reanne Evans, the 2004 champion, did not enter the event. There were twenty entries, and two qualifying groups of ten players were set, each to be played as a round-robin, with the top four from each group qualifying for the eight-player knock-out phase to decide the winner. Following withdrawals, only nine players participated in each group. Wendy Jans scored nine of the eleven top  in the competition on her way to winning the title.

References

External links
Official event website

IBSF World Championships
IBSF World Championship
Snooker amateur tournaments
International sports competitions hosted by Jordan
Sports competitions in Amman